The Yadkin Valley AVA is an American Viticultural Area that includes land in seven counties of northwestern North Carolina. The Yadkin Valley AVA includes all of Wilkes, Surry, and Yadkin counties, and parts of Davie, Davidson, Forsyth, and Stokes counties. Yadkin Valley is home to 44 wineries.

History 
For decades, the area was a key tobacco-growing region. However, as tobacco farming and cigarette manufacturing in the area declined, some entrepreneurs, including tobacco farmers, have turned to winemaking.  The native grapes of this region of the southeastern United States include Vitis cordifolia, Vitis labrusca, Vitis aestivalis, Vitis cinerea, and Vitis rotundifolia (muscadine and scuppernong). Early attempts to grow the European wine grape, Vitis vinifera, in the southeastern United States, including 18th century efforts by Thomas Jefferson at Monticello, Virginia, had mixed success. But in the past two to three decades, viticultural research has helped these grapes to survive the climate, soil, and pests of the region. Additionally, Surry Community College, located in Dobson, North Carolina, has served as a valuable community resource for this growing industry by offering certificate and degree programs in viticulture and enology. In 2005, Davidson County Community College formed a partnership with Surry Community College for the delivery of the viticulture and enology program/certifications in Davidson and Davie counties.

In 2003, in an effort led by Charlie and Ed Shelton of Shelton Vineyards, the United States' Bureau of Alcohol, Tobacco, Firearms and Explosives approved the new appellation for the region with the name Yadkin Valley AVA, allowing winemakers to bottle wines with a label indicating that the wine came from the Yadkin Valley. By 2013, there were 38 wineries operating in the Yadkin Valley. As of December 13, 2022, there were 44 wineries making wine in the Yadkin Valley.

Geography 
The Yadkin Valley area is in the piedmont and foothills of the Blue Ridge Mountains. One of the most recognizable landmarks in the AVA is Pilot Mountain. The hardiness zone is mostly 7a and 7b, with 6b in some higher areas.

Travel
Decanter Magazine published a story about the Yadkin Valley region in October 2021. 

Southern Living Magazine published a feature story about the Yadkin Valley region in November 2007.

Local wine festivals 
The Yadkin Valley Wine Festival is traditionally held the third Saturday in May at the Municipal Park in Elkin.  The Yadkin Valley Grape Festival is held the third Saturday in October in Yadkinville. Prior to 2005, these wineries also participated in the North Carolina Wine Festival. The Budbreak Wine and Craft Beer Festival is usually held in downtown Mount Airy, North Carolina on the first Saturday in May.

Yadkin Valley Wine Festival

Wineries

 Adagio Vineyards
 Brandon Hills Vineyard
Carolina Heritage
 Cellar 4201
 Childress Vineyards
Curran Alexander
Divine Llama
Dobbins Creek Vineyards
Dynamis Estate Wines
 Elkin Creek Vineyard
 Golden Road Vineyards
 Grassy Creek Vineyard & Winery
Hanover Park
 Haze Gray Vineyards
Herrera Vineyards
 Hidden Vineyard
 JOLO Winery & Vineyards
 Jones von Drehle Vineyards
Junius Lindsay
 Laurel Gray Vineyards
 Lazy Elm Vineyards
McRitchie Winery & Ciderworks
Medaloni Cellars
MenaRick Vineyards
 Midnight Magdalena Vineyards
Native Vines Winery
 Old North State Winery
Piccione Vineyards
Pilot Mountain Vineyards
 Raffaldini Vineyards
RagApple Lassie Winery
 RayLen Winery and Vineyards
 Roaring River Vineyards
Round Peak
Sanders Ridge Winery
Serre Vineyards
 Shadow Springs Vineyard
 Shelton Vineyards
Slightly Askew Winery
 Stardust Cellars
 Stony Knoll Vineyards
Surry Cellars
Weathervane Winery
 Windsor Run Cellars

References

External links
North Carolina Grape Council
NC Fine Wines
Map of all of the Yadkin Valley Wineries
Surry Community College Department of Viticulure & Enology
Yadkin Valley Wine Festival Homepage
Yadkin Valley Wine Trail - lists wineries, dining, lodging, ancillary visitor information
Yadkin Valley Wine Country

American Viticultural Areas
Geography of Davidson County, North Carolina
Geography of Davie County, North Carolina
Geography of North Carolina
Geography of Forsyth County, North Carolina
Geography of Iredell County, North Carolina
North Carolina wine
Geography of Stokes County, North Carolina
Geography of Surry County, North Carolina
Geography of Wilkes County, North Carolina
Geography of Yadkin County, North Carolina
2002 establishments in North Carolina